Heng Ee High School is a Chinese conforming secondary school located in George Town, Penang.

Founder
Heng Ee High School was founded by a Belgian Roman Catholic expatriate missionary priest, Dato' Father Arthur A. Julien, from the Paris Foreign Missions Society in 1957.

Father Julien arrived in Malaysia in 1952. He served as parish priest of the Church of Our Lady of Sorrows from 1961 to 1963, and as assistant parish priest to the Church of the Holy Spirit (now Cathedral of the Holy Spirit) with Father Paul Decroix between 1976 and 1984. Father Julien's work extended beyond the church. He conducted missionary work with the community in places like Batu Maung, Bayan Lepas and Sungai Dua, and also regularly visited the detainees in Pulau Jerejak. His ability to converse in Mandarin, and later Hokkien, endeared him to the local community.

Father Julien set up Heng Ee High School along Hamilton Road and Heng Ee Primary School within the grounds of the Church of Our Lady of Sorrows along Macalister Road. His passing on 11 September 2004, brought mourners from all walks of life to his funeral.

School principals

School History

Blazonry

Motto
To Contrive and To Serve
(Chinese: 勤学敬业)
(Malay: Berusaha dan Berbakti)

Vision
Local Roots, Global Outlook
(Chinese: 扎根本土，放眼全球)
(Malay: Berjiwa Lokal, Berminda Global)

Mission
 To instill moral and cultural values in students.
 To train students to think with an open mind.
 To prepare students to face global challenges.

Crest
The crest is colored blue which denotes brotherhood and mercy and on the other hand the background is colored white, symbolizing pureness, honesty and good morality.

Armorial bearings:
 The Star symbolizes the light of knowledge. It also symbolizes mankind's noble aspirations.
 The Mountains symbolizes the steadfastness and our eternal belief.
 The River represents the ever renewing dynamic force of nature.

School anthem
天地有正气
千秋万古存
为学以恒立
事业赖敬尊 
正义修身根
博爱处世本
正义连博爱
立志作完人
钢铁的意志
巩固的友情
崇高的理想
永恒的信仰

Amenities
The campus comprises an area of 6.5 hectares and consists of 6 blocks with a field.

Block A
Block A was the first and the oldest building to be built. Completed in 1967, the four-story building comprises 17 classrooms and offices for senior assistants.

Block B
Block B was built in 1969, houses the Principal's office, a prayer room, 2 computer rooms, 4 science laboratories, a Biology laboratory, a Chemistry laboratory, a Physics laboratory and an arts room.

Block C
Block C was the adjoining block that connect Block A to Block B where the school library, co-operative outlet, counseling room, SPBT room, media room as well as where the school administration computer room is located. Three classrooms were located on Level 4. In September 2011, the school library is relocated to Level 2 Block F Bangunan Wawasan meanwhile the vacant library now served as the storeroom. The school has not announced any plans to develop the vacant library for the time being.

Block D
Block D was completed in 1975. The first floor of Block D was formerly the school canteen and was currently used as the staffroom and the meeting room. Opposite the staffroom was the air-conditioned lecture hall. Above the staffroom was the school hall (光前堂). Lecture Hall 2 was situated on the second hall opposite the balcony of the school hall.

Block E
Block E was completed in 1987. The ground floor consists of a carpentry room, a cooking room, a sewing room, an electronic room, the prefects room and a gymnasium. The air-conditioned Music Room I was located on the second floor. In 1999, the school topped up another floor on Block E which includes an additional 7 classrooms and another air-conditioned Music Room II to accommodate the increasing number of students.

Block F: Bangunan Wawasan

The Bangunan Wawasan (Chinese: 宏愿楼) was built in 2011. The eight-story Bangunan Wawasan comprises a foyer at Level 1, a fully air-conditioned modern library at Level 2, two multi-purpose halls at Level 3, three lecture theatres at Level 4, a rooftop loft and an astronomical observatory at the rooftop. Bangunan Wawasan is also equipped with the necessary infrastructure and ICT facilities to provide the students with a positive and supportive environment that is conducive for academic and social growth.

Penang Chinese Chamber of Commerce had donated RM2 mil for the construction of Bangunan Wawasan along with other efforts and sponsors. This prompted the school board of directors to rename the building as Bangunan Wawasan Penang Chinese Chamber of Commerce.

The building was officially launched on 9 September 2011. Present to officiate the new building were the Chief Minister, Heng Ee board of trustees chairman Datuk Loh Geok Beng, and chamber president Tan Sri Tan Kok Ping.

Sports facilities
The sports infrastructures in this school include two basketball courts and two volleyball courts located opposite the school (where the ex-pupils association is), a mini gymnasium(not open to students who are not in the Body Building Club)on Level 1 of Block E, two badminton courts in the school hall, a football field and a 6 lane 100 meter running track. There is also table tennis tables situated in the school hall which can be set up.

Canteen
The original location of the school canteen was at Level 1 of Block C which was the current staffroom. Years later, it was moved to a bigger site beside Block E. Due to the school's expansion plan for the 8-storey Bangunan Wawasan, the canteen was demolished and moved to a temporary site behind Block B while waiting for the completion of Bangunan Wawasan. At first the school planned to rebuild the canteen at Level 1 of Bangunan Wawasan. As the number of students increased gradually over the years, the school decided to make it permanent instead of shifting back to its original site. At the same time, three ventilating machines were installed.

References

External links
 Smjk.edu.my

Secondary schools in Malaysia
Publicly funded schools in Malaysia
Educational institutions established in 1957
1957 establishments in Malaya
Chinese-language schools in Malaysia
Buildings and structures in George Town, Penang
Catholic schools in Malaysia
Schools in Penang